Eugene Skeef FRSA is a South African percussionist, composer, poet, educationalist and animator living in London since 1980. He also works in conflict resolution, acts as a consultant on cultural development, teaches creative leadership and is a broadcaster. In 2003 he founded Umoya Creations, a charity set up to facilitate this international work.

Eugene’s roots are firmly established in his cultural work with Steve Biko, the late South African civil rights leader. As a young activist he co-led a nationwide literacy campaign teaching in schools, colleges and communities across apartheid South Africa.

Eugene is at the forefront of the contemporary music scene, collaborating with innovative artists like Anthony Tidd, Brian Eno, Bheki Mseleku, Tunde Jegede and Eddie Parker. He has brought his extensive experience, as an advisor, to the Contemporary Music Network. He has also been instrumental in developing the education programmes of some of the major classical orchestras in the United Kingdom, including the London Philharmonic Orchestra (LPO), the London Sinfonietta and the Royal Scottish National Orchestra.

Eugene is a Fellow of the Royal Society of Arts and sits on the board of directors of the LPO. He is on the advisory committee of SoundJunction, the Associated Board of the Royal Schools of Music’s interactive multimedia educational project. In September 2004 he was appointed musician in residence of the Purcell School of Music.

In March 2005 Eugene performed with his Abantu Ensemble at Buckingham Palace and was presented to the Queen as part of the historic Music Day to celebrate the diversity of culture in Britain.

In the winter of 2006 Eugene was awarded an Arts Council England Fellowship to the Banff Arts Centre in Canada to spend three months developing In Memory Of Our seasons,  a multi-media commission from the London Sinfonietta.

In June 2006 SoundJunction – of which Eugene was content producer, author and advisor – won the prestigious New Media Age (NMA) award in the music category.

Eugene sits with Howard Goodall and Mary King on the judging panel of the BBC Choir of the Year competition.  His choral work Harmony was performed at Westminster Abbey in March 2007 before the Queen and Commonwealth High Commissioners to promote global tolerance and understanding.

In 2007 Eugene directed Motherland, a dance theatre piece he created with an international cast in acknowledgement of the 200th anniversary of the abolition of the slave trade act.

In June 2008 Eugene and Richard Bissill’s Excite!, an orchestral commission by the London Philharmonic Orchestra, premiered at the Royal Festival Hall at Southbank Centre, London.

In 2012, Eugene performed at Orchestra In A Field, a classical/popular music cross over festival situated in Glastonbury Abbey, Somerset. The event was televised by Channel 4.

Eugene is part of an international peace-building initiative called Quartet of Peace, initiated by Brian Lisus, a South African luthier. He has composed uxolo (meaning forgiveness, in the Zulu language), specially commissioned for Brian’s string quartet of instruments in honour of South Africa’s 4 Nobel laureates, Nelson Mandela, Dr. Albert Luthuli, FW de Klerk and Archbishop Desmond Tutu.
In 2014 Eugene composed the song Fruits Of Our Gifts for Big Big Sing, the national singing initiative connected to the Commonwealth Games in Glasgow.

External links 
 Umoya Creations 
 Eugene Skeef's Official Website
 Eugene Skeef's Rhythm For Life blog
 Quartet of Peace blog

British percussionists
Music educators
South African musicians
South African composers
South African male composers
Musicians from London
Anti-apartheid activists
South African activists
South African exiles
South African expatriates in England
Year of birth missing (living people)
Living people